Isolaimiidae is a family of nematodes belonging to the order Araeolaimida.

Genera:
 Isolaimium Cobb, 1920

References

Nematodes